Castelo do Castrodouro is a small castle or large country house in Alfoz in Lugo province in the Galicia region of north-west Spain, who once belonged to Pardo de Cela's family.

Galician architecture
Castles in Galicia (Spain)
Bien de Interés Cultural landmarks in the Province of Lugo